Lacerta pamphylica is a species of lizard in the family Lacertidae. It is endemic to  Turkey.

References

 
Reptiles of Turkey
Endemic fauna of Turkey
Reptiles described in 1975
Taxa named by Josef Friedrich Schmidtler